Heliox is a breathing gas mixture of helium (He) and oxygen (O2). It is used as a medical treatment for patients with difficulty breathing because mixture generates less resistance than atmospheric air when passing through the airways of the lungs, and thus requires less effort by a patient to breathe in and out of the lungs. It is also used as a breathing gas diluent for deep ambient pressure diving as it is not narcotic at high pressure, and for its low work of breathing.

Heliox has been used medically since the 1930s, and although the medical community adopted it initially to alleviate symptoms of upper airway obstruction, its range of medical uses has since expanded greatly, mostly because of the low density of the gas. Heliox is also used in saturation diving and sometimes during the deep phase of technical dives.

Medical uses 
In medicine heliox may refer to a mixture of 21% O2 (the same as air) and 79% He, although other combinations are available (70/30 and 60/40).

Heliox generates less airway resistance than air and thereby requires less mechanical energy to ventilate the lungs. "Work of Breathing" (WOB) is reduced by two mechanisms:
 increased tendency to laminar flow;
 reduced resistance in turbulent flow due to lower density.
Heliuox 20/80 diffuses 1.8 times faster than oxygen, and the flow of heliox20/80 from an oxygen flowmeter is 1.8 times the normal flow for oxygen.

Heliox has a similar viscosity to air but a significantly lower density (0.5 g/L versus 1.25 g/L at STP). Flow of gas through the airway comprises laminar flow, transitional flow and turbulent flow. The tendency for each type of flow is described by the Reynolds number. Heliox's low density produces a lower Reynolds number and hence higher probability of laminar flow for any given airway. Laminar flow tends to generate less resistance than turbulent flow.

In the small airways where flow is laminar, resistance is proportional to gas viscosity and is not related to density and so heliox has little effect. The Hagen–Poiseuille equation describes laminar resistance. In the large airways where flow is turbulent, resistance is proportional to density, so heliox has a significant effect.

There is also some use of heliox in conditions of the medium airways (croup, asthma and chronic obstructive pulmonary disease). A recent trial has suggested that lower fractions of helium (below 40%) thus allowing a higher fraction of oxygen might also have the same beneficial effect on upper airway obstruction.

Patients with these conditions may develop a range of symptoms including dyspnea (breathlessness), hypoxemia (below-normal oxygen content in the arterial blood) and eventually a weakening of the respiratory muscles due to exhaustion, which can lead to respiratory failure and require intubation and mechanical ventilation. Heliox may reduce all these effects, making it easier for the patient to breathe. Heliox has also found utility in the weaning of patients off mechanical ventilation, and in the nebulization of inhalable drugs, particularly for the elderly. Research has also indicated advantages in using helium–oxygen mixtures in delivery of anaesthesia.

History 
Heliox has been used medically since the early 1930s. It was the mainstay of treatment in acute asthma before the advent of bronchodilators. Currently, heliox is mainly used in conditions of large airway narrowing (upper airway obstruction from tumors or foreign bodies and vocal cord dysfunction).

Usage in diving 

Helium diluted breathing gases are used to eliminate or reduce the effects of inert gas narcosis, and to reduce work of breathing due to increased gas density at depth. Owing to the expense of helium, heliox is most likely to be used in deep saturation diving. It is also sometimes used by technical divers, particularly those using rebreathers, which conserve the breathing gas at depth much better than open circuit scuba.

The proportion of oxygen in a diving mix depends on the maximum depth of the dive plan, but it is often hypoxic and may be less than 10%.

Because sound travels faster in heliox than in air, voice formants are raised, making divers' speech very high-pitched and hard to understand to people not used to it. Surface personnel often employ a piece of communications equipment called a "helium de-scrambler", which electronically lowers the pitch of the diver's voice as it is relayed through the communications gear, making it easier to understand.

Trimix is a less expensive alternative to heliox for deep diving, which uses only enough helium to limit narcosis and gas density to tolerable levels for the planned depth. Trimix is often used in technical diving, and is also sometimes used in professional diving.

In 2015, the United States Navy Experimental Diving Unit showed that decompression from bounce dives using trimix is not more efficient  than dives on heliox.

See also

References

Further reading

External links 
 

Breathing gases
Asthma
Helium
Medical treatments
Respiratory therapy

ro:Heliox